The Third Battle of the Isonzo was fought from 18 October through 4 November 1915 between the armies of Italy and Austria-Hungary.

Background 
This battle was a part of World War I. The first move was made in Italy, on the eastern sector; because this was their third attack that year, it was named as the Third Battle of the Isonzo (as the previous two were named the First and Second Battles of the Isonzo).

After roughly two and a half months of reprieve to recuperate from the casualties incurred from frontal assaults from the First and Second Battle of the Isonzo, Luigi Cadorna, Italian commander-in-chief, understood that artillery played a fundamental role on the front and brought the total number to 1,250 pieces. As well as improving artillery, the Italian Army was also issued Adrian Helmets, which proved useful in some situations but overall ineffective.

The main objectives were to take the Austro-Hungarian bridgeheads at Bovec (Plezzo in Italian), Tolmin, and (if possible) the town of Gorizia. Cadorna's tactic, of deploying his forces evenly along the entire Soča (Isonzo), proved indecisive, and the Austro-Hungarians took advantage of this by concentrating their firepower in certain areas. Specifically, the two objectives of the attack were Mount Sabotino and Mount San Michele.

Location 
This took place on the Austro-Hungarian side of the border between Austria-Hungary and Italy. The battle is named for the river that it was fought on (the Isonzo river), as well as the previous battles and the many that would eventually follow. Unfortunately for the Italians, it was not a prime location for attack maneuvers, since it had mountainous terrain on both sides. It also had frequently flooded banks. However, it was chosen because the Austro-Hungarian side had control of most of the other areas in the Isonzo region.

Battle 
Due to extensive artillery barrages, the Italians were able to advance to Plave (Plava in Italian) near Kanal ob Soči, beneath the southern end of the Banjšice Plateau (Bainsizza), and on Mount San Michele on the Kras plateau in an attempt to outflank those forces defending Gorizia. The plateau near San Michele was the scene of heavy attacks and counterattacks involving the Italian Third Army and Austro-Hungarian reinforcements from the Eastern and Balkan fronts under the command of Svetozar Boroević; both sides suffered heavy casualties.

Thanks to the low profile held by Boroević's forces, the Austro-Hungarians were able to hold their positions despite heavy casualties, which were dwarfed by those of the Italian Army. This battle proved Boroević's tactical brilliance despite the limited scope of the front.

The lull in action lasted barely two weeks at which time the Italian offensive started anew.

The Italians made some progress before they were eventually forced back by the Austro-Hungarians. Although the second Italian army had possession of Mt. Sabotino for a brief period of time, they were countered by the Austro-Hungarians'. The Third Army was able to approach Mt. San Michele, but were met with machine gun fire when attempting to sneak around the flank that was guarding Gorizia. The Austro-Hungarians did not lose as many men during this, but proportionally, each side suffered similar losses.

Criticism of Luigi Cadorna 
Luigi Cadorna was a well-known man throughout Italy for his achievements and background; however, because of the failures the Italians suffered during World War I, Luigi Cadorna received quite a bit of negative feedback. His poor leadership skills led to many deserters during, and after the Battles of the Isonzo. He assumed that the morale of Italian soldiers would win the battles at the end of the day. It was not until this Third Battle that he actually considered the sizes of troops and the amount of gunpower they possessed.

Because he concentrated his attacks in very small areas, the Austro-Hungarians were able to do the same exact thing; therefore there was literally no advantage besides the fact that Cadorna had brought a few more troops in. However, because of the terrain and the area of the attack, the larger numbers also did not do the Italians much good.

Aftermath 
Cadorna decided to attack again a week later, starting the Fourth Battle of the Isonzo. However, it was not until the Sixth that the Italians would gain any ground and establish a presence at Gorizia.

See also
First Battle of the Isonzo - 23 June–7 July 1915
Second Battle of the Isonzo - 18 July–3 August 1915
Fourth Battle of the Isonzo - 10 November–2 December 1915
Fifth Battle of the Isonzo - 9 March–17 March 1916
Sixth Battle of the Isonzo - 6 August–17 August 1916
Seventh Battle of the Isonzo - 14 September–17 September 1916
Eighth Battle of the Isonzo - 10 October–12 October 1916
Ninth Battle of the Isonzo - 1 November–4 November 1916
Tenth Battle of the Isonzo - 12 May–8 June 1917
Eleventh Battle of the Isonzo - 19 August–12 September 1917
Twelfth Battle of the Isonzo - 24 October–7 November 1917 also known as the Battle of Caporetto

References

Further reading
Macdonald, John, and Željko Cimprič. Caporetto and the Isonzo Campaign: The Italian Front, 1915-1918. Barnsley, South Yorkshire: Pen & Sword Military, 2011.  

Bauer, E., 1985: Der Lowe vom Isonzo, Feldmarschall Svetozar Boroević de Bojna. Aufl. Styria. Graz
Boroević, S., 1923: O vojni proti Italiji (prevod iz nemškega jezika). Ljubljana
Comando supremo R.E. Italiano, 1916: Addestramento della fanteria al combattimento. Roma. Tipografia del Senato

External links
Battlefield Maps: Italian Front
11 battles at the Isonzo
The Walks of Peace in the Soča Region Foundation. The Foundation preserves, restores and presents the historical and cultural heritage of the First World War in the area of the Isonzo Front for the study, tourist and educational purposes.
The Kobarid Museum (in English) 
Društvo Soška Fronta (in Slovenian)
Pro Hereditate - extensive site (in En/It/Sl)

Isonzo 03
Isonzo 03
Isonzo 03
Isonzo 03
the Isonzo
1915 in Italy
1915 in Austria-Hungary
October 1915 events
November 1915 events

pl:Bitwy nad Isonzo
sl:Soška fronta